Carex musei is a tussock-forming species of perennial sedge in the family Cyperaceae. It is native to Réunion island in the Indian Ocean.

See also
List of Carex species

References

musei
Plants described in 1855
Taxa named by Ernst Gottlieb von Steudel
Flora of Réunion